East Forsyth High School is located in the town of Kernersville in Forsyth County, North Carolina. It is laid out in a college-campus style with numerous small buildings rather than a single large building.

Facilities
East Forsyth currently has a total of nine main classroom buildings; four buildings house eight classrooms, two others house ten classrooms, and one houses up to sixteen. Two "pod" trailers are housed in the back of the campus. There are also two gyms, an auditorium, cafeteria, courtyard, technology building, and an office building with a library.

Recently completed renovations on campus have ultimately changed the entire school. A two-story, "L" shaped building has been built; it houses 16 classrooms, office facilities, as well as a new media center. The existing office building has been renovated as well; it now houses fine arts as well as the business and technology education programs on campus. The auditorium and some of the current buildings have been updated, and new traffic pattern is also in place for the campus.

Athletics 
East Forsyth High School offers many sports including Swimming, Wrestling, Track, and Football.    
The full list of East Forsyth's Athletic programs includes: Baseball, Basketball, Soccer, The Eaglettes Dance Team, Cheerleading, Softball, Cross Country, Swimming, Tennis, Football, Volleyball, Golf, Wrestling, Field Hockey, Track and Lacrosse.

In 1992, East Forsyth won its first State football championship. Led by Head Coach Joe Bill Ellender and the AP all state trio of, quarterback Joe Lagarde, and OL/DL leaders James Clyburn and  Gary Wadford, the Eagles completed a 15–0–0 season by defeating Northern High School (Durham, NC) in the NCHSAA 4A championship game ranked 15th in the USA TODAY super 25 poll.

In 2008, East Forsyth Had one of its best seasons by going 12–2. That record was just beat in 2012 with East Forsyth Going 13–1 with an undefeated 11–0 regular season. In the 2014 season the Eagles won another conference championship  beating Northwest Guildford 36–15

East Forsyth's main rival is Glenn High School.  In past football seasons, the East-Glenn game was one of the first games of the year.  Now with both teams in the Piedmont-Triad 4A conference.

On December 4, 2015, the football season came to a close one game away from the 4AA state championship. The East Forsyth Eagles fell in overtime against nationally ranked Mallard Creek of Charlotte, North Carolina. The final score was 41–38. The Western regional final broke an attendance record making it the most attended game in East Forsyth History at Fred E Lewis field.

In December 2018, East Forsyth won its second football State championship. The Eagles beat Scotland High to win their first state title since 1992.

In December 2019, East Forsyth won its third football State championship. Defending its title against Cardinal Gibbons, beating them 24–21.

Notable alumni
 Madison Bailey  actress
 Turner Battle  college basketball coach
 Chante Black  WNBA player
 Alan Caldwell  NFL defensive back
 Ashley Christensen  chef, restaurateur, author, and culinary celebrity
 Ryan Dull  MLB pitcher
 Emily V. Gordon  Award-Winning Writer, Producer of The Big Sick a wife of Kumail Nanjiani
 DeLana Harvick  former co-manager of Kevin Harvick Incorporated; wife of Kevin Harvick
 Ricky Hickman  professional basketball player
 Brent LaRue  middle-distance runner, represented Slovenia at the 2012 Summer Olympics
 Kevin Mattison  MLB outfielder
 Ben Newnam  professional soccer player
 Danny O'Brien  Canadian Football League coach and former quarterback
 Tyson Patterson  professional basketball player
 Josh Pittman  professional basketball player
 Greg Scales  NFL tight end
 Geno Segers  actor for Disney's Pair of Kings
 Alec Zumwalt  MLB coach

References

External links
East Forsyth Website
East Forsyth Band Website
Winston-Salem/Forsyth County Schools

1962 establishments in North Carolina
Educational institutions established in 1962
Public high schools in North Carolina
Schools in Forsyth County, North Carolina